The 2008 4 Nations Cup was the 13th playing of the annual women's ice hockey tournament. It was held in Lake Placid, New York, from November 4–9, 2008.

Results

Final Table

Final

3rd place

External links
Tournament on hockeyarchives.info

2008-09
2008–09 in Finnish ice hockey
2008–09 in Swedish ice hockey
2008–09 in Canadian women's ice hockey
2008–09 in American women's ice hockey
2008-09
2008–09 in women's ice hockey